The Cathedral of the Holy Cross is the cathedral of the Roman Catholic Archdiocese of Boston and is the largest Roman Catholic church in New England.

When construction was finished, the cathedral rivaled both Old South Church and Trinity Church in grandeur. The cathedral is located in the city's South End neighborhood, at 1400 Washington St. Although the South End was initially developed for Boston's emerging Anglo-Saxon Protestant middle class, the neighborhood transitioned to new immigrants, especially Irish, as middle class owners moved to the new Back Bay neighborhood.

The cathedral functions both as a cathedral and as a parish. The Cathedral Parish consists of large English- and Spanish-speaking congregations, drawn largely from the local area, and also includes three Archdiocese-wide congregations: the Ge'ez Rite practiced by Ethiopian, Eritrean, and Egyptian Catholics; the German Apostolate; and the Tridentine Mass Catholic community. The first of these congregations moved to the cathedral from the nearby Holy Trinity Catholic Church in 1994, the other two in 2008.

History
In 1860, Bishop John Fitzpatrick recognized that the church in Boston had outgrown the old Holy Cross Cathedral on Franklin St. However, plans for the new cathedral were disrupted by the outbreak of the United States Civil War. Bishop Fitzpatrick died in 1866 and Bishop John Williams took over planning for the cathedral project. Ground was broken on April 29, 1866, and the completed structure was dedicated on December 8, 1875, by Williams, who was by then Boston's first archbishop.

The cathedral was named after the relic of holy cross that is owned by the church. This relic, supposedly a small fragment of the cross from Jesus' crucifixion was on display in the cathedral until 2018 when a janitor discovered that it had been stolen. The relic was eventually returned to the cathedral, and since its theft the relic has only been on display during special dates throughout the liturgical year.

In 2018, the first major renovation of the cathedral began. During the process, approximately 8,000 square feet of reclaimed wood was salvaged from the building. The $26 million renovation was completed on Palm Sunday 2019.

Architecture
The cathedral was designed by Patrick Keely, a noted ecclesiastical architect, in the Gothic Revival style. Construction commenced in 1867 and was completed in 1875. With local anti-Catholic sentiments a recent memory, the Gothic Revival edifice was intentionally massive, a statement that the Catholics of Boston were here to stay. Bricks from the 1834 riots in Charlestown, in which an Ursuline convent was burned down, were used in the arch over the front door. Built of Roxbury puddingstone with gray limestone trim, it reaches a height of 120 feet. Until the erection of the new Cathedral of St. Joseph (Hartford, Connecticut) in 1957, Holy Cross was the largest cathedral in New England. There is also an oratory for smaller services in the lower level. A planned western spire was never completed. Supervision of the construction fell largely to Keely and his assistant John A. Dempwolf.

The cathedral retains its E. and G.G. Hook and Hastings pipe organ, opus 801, which was installed in 1875.  The organ console was replaced in 1929 with a used theatre organ console when the instrument was updated.  In 2003, the Andover Organ Company created and installed its opus R-394, a replica of the original three-manual console, and updated wiring and made other needed repairs.

Notable events
On January 19, 1964, Richard Cardinal Cushing celebrated a Requiem for President John F. Kennedy that was recorded and broadcast to the nation. The Boston Symphony Orchestra accompanied the Mozart Requiem.

On October 1, 1979, Pope John Paul II held a 38-minute prayer service for 2,000 priests in the cathedral during his first pilgrimage to the United States.

On April 18, 2013, an interfaith prayer vigil in honor of the victims of the Boston Marathon bombing took place at the cathedral, with President Barack Obama delivering the eulogy.

Cathedral High School
In 1927, Cardinal William O'Connell founded Cathedral High School adjacent to the church and charged the Sisters of St. Joseph with operating the institution.  The school remains at this site today.

Photos

See also
List of churches in the Roman Catholic Archdiocese of Boston
List of Catholic cathedrals in the United States
List of cathedrals in the United States

References

External links

 Official Cathedral Site
 Archdiocese of Boston Official Site
 Keely Society
 Boston Globe Highlight
 Archdiocesan Information Page

Roman Catholic Archdiocese of Boston
Roman Catholic churches in Boston
Holy Cross, Cathedral of the
Roman Catholic churches completed in 1875
19th-century Roman Catholic church buildings in the United States
Gothic Revival church buildings in Massachusetts
Patrick Keely buildings
Towers in Massachusetts